The Speaker is elected by the House, either among its own members (other than ministers) or from among persons who are not members. This is an incomplete list of speakers of the House of Assembly of Eswatini before and after Swaziland was renamed to Eswatini. The below is a list of speakers of the House of Assembly of Eswatini:

Footnote and references 

Politics of Eswatini
Eswatini